Will Rogers Middle and High School, located at 3909 E. 5th Place in Tulsa, Oklahoma, was built by Tulsa Public Schools in 1939 using WPA workers and designed by Joseph R. Koberling, Jr. and Leon B. Senter. It was named for the humorist Will Rogers, who died in 1935, along with Wiley Post in a plane crash. Significant additions were made to the original structure in 1949 and 1964. The alterations were in keeping with the original design and did not detract from the school's architectural or historical significance. It has been called "... one of the  best examples of Art Deco high school architecture...in the United States.

The school had approximately 1,000 students as of 2008, and more than 39,000 alumni.

History

The growth of the oil industry in Tulsa spurred a major population explosion that created a huge demand for homes and schools through the 1910s and 1920s. By 1920, Tulsa had built three senior high schools: Central in the downtown area, Booker T. Washington in North Tulsa and Clinton in West Tulsa. The Board of Education had already realized the urgent need for two more such schools, one on the west side of Tulsa and the other on the east side.

The school board received a grant from the federal Public Works Administration for both the westside and eastside schools on October 22, 1936. This was the seed money that allowed the preparation of bids, which were opened in July, 1937.

The school occupies a  site within a residential area. In September, 1936, the Tulsa School District bought the tract in the southwestern quarter of Section 4, Township 19N, Range 13E from Mr. and Mrs. Fred Turner. It is bounded by East 4th Place South Street on the north, South Pittsburg Avenue on the east, East 5th Place South on the south, and Turner Park on the west. As originally constructed, the structure contained 200,000 sq. ft. of space. A 1949 addition to the east wing contained 21,016 square feet of space. An addition to the west wing in 1964 added four levels of classroom space.

In the 2008/09 school year, Rogers English teacher Brian Grimm was honored with the district's title of "teacher of the Year". Tulsa Public Schools has 83 schools and 3,300 teachers and staff.

The school's colors are royal blue and gold, the mascot is a Roper (i.e. a cowboy who specializes in using a rope to manage cattle) and the students are known as the Ropers. The school's symbol is based upon the dogiron (branding iron) used by the Rogers family.

On September 6, 2007, the Will Rogers High School building was added to the National Register of Historic Places with national significance.  It is an example of Art Deco. The National Park Service has stated that it is one of the best examples of Art Deco high school architecture in the United States.

Building description
The 1939 building was constructed with a basement and three stories.

Change to dual enrollment school
In 2011, Tulsa Public Schools converted Will Rogers High School to a dual enrollment school for students offering those who complete the program at Rogers up to 66 college units, the equivalent of an associate degree. It has been since renamed "Will Rogers College Junior High and High School."  The student body consists of grades 6 through 12, eliminating the traditional middle school. The first graduating class after this change was in 2014.

Tulsa Will Rogers High School Foundation
The school has a group of alumni who run the Tulsa Will Rogers High School Foundation, which provides grants and scholarships to Rogers faculty and students. The foundation was established in the 1990s and continues to this day.

Notable alumni 
John Ashley (1934–1997), actor, producer and singer
Charles Bell (painter) (1935–1995), noted artist
Elvin Bishop, musician. Blues-rock guitarist best known for his hit "Fooled Around and Fell in Love."
Anita Bryant, singer. A former Miss Oklahoma, she was famous as a television spokesperson for Florida orange juice. She spearheaded opposition to a gay rights ordinance in Florida in 1977.
Phillip N. Butler (1938), a U.S. Navy Commander, naval aviator and the eighth-longest-held U.S. prisoner of war (POW) held in North Vietnam during the Vietnam War.
Don Chandler (1934–2011), American professional football player.
Paul Brooks Davis (1938), noted artist and graphic designer.
David Gates, singer. Singer and songwriter, best known as the lead singer of the group Bread.
Archie Goodwin (1937–1998), legendary comic book writer and editor, notably for DC, Warren and Marvel.
S. E. Hinton, novelist. Wrote The Outsiders in her junior year at Rogers.
Dave Hudgens played for the University of Oklahoma and was a 1978 third round draft pick of the Dallas Cowboys.
Lee Mayberry NBA player, 1992 first round draft pick
Russell Myers, cartoonist. Created the comic strip Broom Hilda
Dave Rader, WRHS class of 1971, NCAA college football coach. Was the coach of the University of Tulsa Golden Hurricane from 1988 until the year 1999. He served as the Offensive Coordinator and Quarterbacks Coach for the University of Alabama Crimson Tide from 2003 to 2006.
Leon Russell, musician. Occasionally referred to as "The Master of Space and Time", a title he acquired around the time of his collaborations with Joe Cocker.
Alvin Setzepfandt, veterinarian and Minnesota state legislator
Gailard Sartain, actor and illustrator. Played Dr. Mazeppa Pompazoidi on "Dr. Mazeppa Pompazoidi's Uncanny Film Festival and Camp Meeting" and later became a regular on Hee Haw. Gailard was also featured in many Hollywood movies.
Bob Smith, former NFL player
Roy Staiger, former Major League Baseball third baseman with the New York Mets and New York Yankees
Robert Taylor, born 1951, native Tulsan, 1969 graduate of WRHS, became a self-taught Native American artist
Bill Van Burkleo, former CFL player
John Ward, former NFL player, played at Oklahoma State University and was a 1970 first Round Draft Pick of the Minnesota Vikings
Darryl Wren, former NFL player

Notes

References

External links 

 Will Rogers High School.com
 Will Rogers Alumni class of 1967
 Famous Will Rogers High School Alumni

Public high schools in Oklahoma
Educational institutions established in 1939
Art Deco architecture in Oklahoma
1939 establishments in Oklahoma
National Register of Historic Places in Tulsa, Oklahoma
Tulsa Public Schools schools